The third season of the animated series Winx Club aired from 29 January to 28 March 2007, consisting of 26 episodes. The series was created by Iginio Straffi, founder of the Rainbow animation studio.

The season focuses on the Winx Club's third and final year at the Alfea College for Fairies, where they strive to earn an enhancement to their powers called Enchantix. The Trix escape from their prison in the Omega Dimension and bring back a new villain named Valtor, who has a special connection with Bloom.

In 2011, the American company Viacom became a co-owner of the Rainbow studio, and Viacom's Nickelodeon began producing a Winx Club revival series. Before airing the Nick-produced episodes, Nickelodeon U.S. broadcast the third season under the title Winx Club: Enchantix from 14 November to 26 December 2011. The Nickelodeon version was re-recorded with the new voice cast from Hollywood.

Overview
The Winx Club begins their third and final year at Alfea. As Winx fairies, the six best friends learn of their full-fledged fairy form, Enchantix, that can only be achieved when a Winx fairy rescues someone from her own home world and shows great courage, bravery, self-sacrifice, and compassion in doing so. The season focuses mainly on Bloom discovering the truth and whereabouts of her birth parents-Oritel and Marion.

In the Omega Dimension, the Trix find and release a powerful and vengeful sorcerer named Valtor, who has a tragic connection to Bloom, as he was directly involved in the destruction of Bloom's home world, Domino, seventeen years ago alongside the three Ancient Witches. They choose to forge an alliance and plan to invade several areas in the realm of Magix and seek vengeance on those who imprisoned them by stealing their exceptionally strong, magical and mystical treasures and immeasurable power sources of each realm.

With their newly strong Enchantix powers, Flora, Stella, Aisha, Tecna, and Musa are able to use strong, incredible power and can miniaturize themselves at will. Bloom, however, cannot miniaturize herself due to the fact that her Enchantix is not complete. The Winx begin their third and final year at Alfea, learning about their unique Enchantix transformations, acquired by selflessly sacrificing, or risking sacrificing, themselves for someone from their home world (or even everyone from every world, in what ends up being Tecna's case) and showing great bravery and courage in doing so.
With no one from her home world to save, Bloom must acquire her Enchantix form and tremendous power on Pyros, the island of dragons.

Episodes

References

External links
 Winx Club website

Winx Club